USS Sea Hawk (SP-2365) was an armed motorboat that served in the United States Navy as a patrol vessel from 1917 to 1919.

Sea Hawk was built in 1917 by Herreshoff Manufacturing Company at Bristol, Rhode Island, as the civilian motorboat Herreshoff No. 319. The U.S. Navy acquired her from Arthur Winslow of Boston, Massachusetts, on 20 October 1917 for World War I service as a patrol boat. She was commissioned as USS Sea Hawk (SP-2365) in December 1917.

Sea Hawk initially served as a patrol boat in the 1st Naval District, operating in the Boston area. Later she was transferred to the 7th Naval District for employment in Florida waters.

Due to an urgent need for craft such as Sea Hawk at Brest, France, an order dated 14 October 1918 went out from Washington, D.C., to Boston, directing the Commandant of the 1st Naval District to ready six section patrol boats -- USS Commodore, Cossack, War Bug, Sea Hawk, Kangaroo, and SP-729—to be shipped to France as deck cargo along with spare parts to keep them operational. However, this proposed movement appears to have been canceled, probably because of the armistice with Germany of 11 November 1918 that ended World War I and eliminated the need for more U.S. Navy patrol craft in Europe.

Decommissioned after World War I ended, Sea Hawk remained at Key West, Florida, awaiting final disposition with other section patrol boats until the night of 9–10 September 1919, when she disappeared in the 1919 Florida Keys hurricane and was not recovered.

References
 for Sea Hawk
 for SP-726 (ex-Apache)
Department of the Navy: Naval Historical Center: Online Library of Selected Images: U.S. Navy Ships: USS Sea Hawk (SP-2365), 1917-1919. Originally named Herreshoff 319
NavSource Online: Section Patrol Craft Photo Archive Sea Hawk (SP 2365)

Patrol vessels of the United States Navy
World War I patrol vessels of the United States
Ships built in Bristol, Rhode Island
1917 ships
Maritime incidents in 1919
Shipwrecks of the Florida Keys